National Civic Party may refer to:

National Civic Party (Hungary)
National Civic Party (Panama)

See also
National Civic Veterans Party, Dominican Republic